Sri Lanka is a member of the South Asian Zone of the Olympic Council of Asia (OCA) and has participated in the South Asian Games since the beginning of the game in 1984.

Sri Lanka has participated all 13 South Asian Games governed by South Asia Olympic Council.

Sri Lanka has performed quite good since 1984 Kathmandu. Sri Lanka has been second-ranked team 4 times, third-ranked team 7 times, fourth-ranked team 2 times.

At 2019 South Asian Games, Sri Lanka had finished highest total medals count 252 including 40 Gold Medals.

Host Games 
Sri Lanka has hosted South Asian Games 2 times : 1991 Colombo, 2006 Colombo

Detailed Medal Count

External links 
 https://www.olympic.lk/

References 

 
South Asian Games
Nations at the South Asian Games